Bryan Cooper may refer to:
COOPER (artist) (born 1976), aka Bryan Cooper, American artist
Bryan Cooper (politician) (1884–1930), Irish independent/Cumann na nGaedhael politician
Bryan Cooper (jockey) (born 1992), Irish National Hunt jockey

See also
Brian Cooper (disambiguation)